At Turbah (alternatively, Turbat Dhubhan) is a town near the coast of the Red Sea in Taiz Governorate, Yemen. It lies about 75 km from Taiz and is about 1,800 metres above sea level. Its population in 2004 was 10,505.

Etymology & History 
The name Turbah in Semitic means 'ancient cemetery', in reference to the bones of the ancestors mixing with the soil. Various places are named Turbah or Al Turbah. Turbat Dhubhan became known as Al-Turbah after its urbanization as a regional capital during the Ottoman era.

Karib 'il Watar Campaign

The Sabaean King Karib'il Watar sacked Dhubhan in his 7th century BC campaigns.

Center of the Zurayid ramp state
Dhubhan, Dimloa, Yumain & Munif were listed among the last citadels surrendered by the Zurayids to the Ayyubids in 1193.

Trade with Azania
Mofarite Merchants were historically the sole mercantile class in Azania. The prolonged presence & admixture with locals since ancient times is best represented in the Swahili language.

Invention of coffee
Muhammad Ibn Said Al Dhobhani, a 15th-century Sufi Imam, who traded goods between Yemen & Ethiopia, introduced the first coffee beans to Yemen. Within a short period coffee was exported out of Mocha & Aden to the rest of the world.

See also
Mocha coffee bean
Caffè mocha

References 

Populated places in Taiz Governorate